Aamer Rahman (born 17 October 1982) is an Australian stand-up comedian of Bangladeshi descent. He is best known as one half of comedy duo Fear of a Brown Planet, along with Nazeem Hussain.

Early life
Rahman's parents, Rezina Rahman and Mushfiq Rahman, were both born and brought up in Bangladesh.

Rahman's father is an engineer. After Rahman's parents got married in Bangladesh they moved to the Middle East.

Rahman was born in Saudi Arabia, although his family often travelled to Bangladesh. He lived in Saudi Arabia until the age of six when his family moved to Australia. They then moved to Oman when he was 10 years old, before returning to Australia when he was 13 years old. He grew up in the western and eastern suburbs of Melbourne.

His childhood was spent moving between Australia and the Middle East. He has a younger sister, Rasha Rahman.

Rahman graduated from Monash University with a degree in law. However he did not use his law degree, although during his time at university he became involved in political protests around issues such as mandatory detention, refugees, and cuts to higher education. He was an editor of the student newspaper, Lot's Wife, in 2002. His sense of humour can be seen developing in edition 7 of that year's paper, a parody of a local paper titled Herald Scum.

Stand-up career

2004–2008
In 2004, Rahman met Nazeem Hussain at an Islamic awards function, as a result of their support for asylum seekers and for anti-racism activism. They became friends and did youth work together in Melbourne.

In 2007, Hussain entered Triple J's Raw Comedy Award open mic competition at the Melbourne Comedy Festival After seeing Hussain compete, Rahman also decided to enter. They beat hundreds of other hopefuls to reach the Victorian State final together. Hussain reached the Victorian final. Rahman won the state final and went onto the national finals where he was voted the runner-up in a performance that was screened on ABC Television.

Due to the success of Raw Comedy they decided to develop their five-minute stand-up routines into a one-hour show together. In five years, they established their own stage show Fear of a Brown Planet and sold out around Australia. Their name plays on the Public Enemy LP, Fear of a Black Planet.

Rahman and Hussain performed their first show in 2007 and their second show in 2008. They were then given a network development deal for a year and a half.

In 2008, Rahman helped out the Allah Made Me Funny tour. In April 2008, Rahman and Hussain first performed Fear of a Brown Planet at Melbourne Fringe Festival. Prior this, Rahman had only been on stage three times.

In 2009, Rahman and Hussain were among ten writers selected for an exclusive script-writing workshop hosted by UK indie film company Warp X, Screen Australia and Madman Entertainment.

2010–present
In 2010, Rahman and Hussain performed their follow up show, Fear of a Brown Planet Returns at the Melbourne International Comedy Festival, Sydney Comedy Festival, and the Adelaide Fringe Festival. In the same year, Rahman performed in the Oxfam Comedy Gala televised on Channel Ten, whilst Hussain performed in the Cracker Night of the Sydney Comedy Festival Gala, televised on The Comedy Channel. In October 2010, they took part in a one-off concert with Azhar Usman, Preacher Moss and Mo Amer (Allah Made Me Funny) at the Athenaeum Theatre in Paris.

During 2011, Rahman and Hussain performed their new show, Fear of a Brown Planet Attacks. In August 2011, they performed at the Edinburgh Festival Fringe. On the way home from Edinburgh they performed an impromptu show in London, after a friend of theirs organised a show in Brixton with two days notice. In the same year, Rahman performed at the Melbourne Comedy Festival.

On 31 August 2011, Fear of a Brown Planet Returns DVD and Blu-ray was released, which was recorded at the Chapel Off Chapel in Melbourne. on 15 January 2011. It features the "best of" material from their 2010 sell-out festival show, also entitled Fear of a Brown Planet Returns, as well as content from their debut shows. In September 2011, Rahman started work on a one-man comedy show. In December 2011 and December 2012, they performed on ABC2.

In April 2012, Hussain and Rahman played at the second show of the Melbourne Comedy Festival. In September 2012, they toured the United Kingdom, where they performed in cities including Manchester, Bradford, London, Birmingham and Cardiff.

In April 2013, he performed his debut solo show, The Truth Hurts, at the Melbourne Comedy Festival.

In 2013, Rahman and Hussain performed at Darwin, Sydney, Brisbane and Melbourne. In October 2013, they performed at the Sydney Opera House.

From 10 to 21 June 2014, he performed "The Truth Hurts" Soho Theatre in London.

Rahman is a regular contributor to Political Asylum, Melbourne's topical stand-up comedy night.

Comedy style
Rahman and Hussain perform alone before handing over to their comedic partner. Rahman's comedy has been described as wry and subversive.

Television and radio career
Rahman has written and performed for television Rahman has worked on Channel 31's program Salam Cafe. He has appeared regularly on ABC Radio National and Triple J, Channel Ten's Melbourne Comedy Festival Gala, The Comedy Channel's You Have Been Watching, ABC1's Tractor Monkeys, he has written for season one of Balls of Steel Australia and is currently developing projects for television.

In 2011, Australian Story broadcast a documentary on the ABC about Rahman's and Hussain's lives in Australia as well as their debut performances in Edinburgh and London.

In 2017, he featured in an ABC and Chemical Media film called You See Monsters, about Muslim Australian artists fighting Islamic bigotry through creativity, satire and irreverence.

Other activities
Rahman is also a part-time youth worker for the Islamic Council of Victoria, and a graphic designer.

In November 2010, Rahman appeared in an advert for Oxfam Australia.

Awards
In 2008, Rahman and Hussain were recipients of the Melbourne International Comedy Festival Best Newcomer Award for their debut show Fear of a Brown Planet.

Views
In December 2014, in his Tumblr post "White Rapper FAQ", Rahman wrote "...A white rapper like Iggy Azalea acts out signifiers which the white majority associates with black culture – hyper sexuality, senseless materialism, an obsession with drugs, money and alcohol – as well as adopting clothing, speech and music – as a costume that they can put on and discard at will. It's a cheap circus act." In January 2015, in the wake of the Charlie Hebdo shooting, he tweeted "As a random Muslim I'll apologise for this Paris incident if random white ppl will apologise for imperialism, drone attacks and Iggy Azalea."

Personal life
Rahman is a Muslim. In October 2011, he moved out of his parental home in Brunswick, Victoria and now lives in Glen Waverley, Victoria. On 9 November 2012, Rahman married Que Ali.

Since its inception in 2009, Rahman has been involved with RISE: Refugees, Survivors and Ex-Detainees – the only refugee organisation in Australia that is run and governed by refugees and ex-detainees. He has been active in visiting RISE members currently in community detention and has been vocal supporters of migrant worker rights. He has developed projects in RISE's Music & Arts portfolio. He has also been involved in RISE's youth development projects including the RISE Music & Arts Festival (2010 and 2011) and RISE's Cypher Hip Hop Project (2011). He is still involved in activism, mostly around refugees and immigration into Australia.

See also
 Bangladeshis in Australia
 Islam in Australia
 Islamic humour

References

External links 

 
 
 Elliott-Cooper, Adam. Aamer Rahman: ‘There’s an expectation of non-white comedians to pander to white audiences’. Ceasefire Magazine, 28 June 2014

1982 births
Living people
Australian Muslims
Australian people of Bengali descent
Australian male comedians
Australian stand-up comedians
Saudi Arabian emigrants to Australia
Muslim male comedians
Australian comedy writers
Australian social workers
Comedians from Melbourne
Monash University alumni
People from Brunswick, Victoria
Saudi Arabian people of Bengali descent
People from Glen Waverley, Victoria
Australian anti-racism activists
Activists from Melbourne